Membras is a genus of fish, Neotropical silversides, from freshwater, brackish water and marine habitats along coastal parts of the Americas.

Species
There are currently six recognized species in this genus:
 Membras analis (L. P. Schultz, 1948) (Backwaters silverside)
 Membras argentea (L. P. Schultz, 1948)
 Membras dissimilis (J. de P. Carvalho, 1956)
 Membras gilberti (D. S. Jordan & Bollman, 1890) (Landia silverside)
 Membras martinica (Valenciennes, 1835) (Rough silverside)
 Membras vagrans (Goode & T. H. Bean, 1879)

References

Atherinopsidae
Ray-finned fish genera
Taxa named by Charles Lucien Bonaparte